Łomża Department (Polish: Departament Łomzyński) was an administrative division and local government in the Polish Duchy of Warsaw in the years 1807–15. The department comprised 10 counties and had its capital at Łomża.

From January to July 1807 the department was known as the Białystok Department (Departament Białostocki), with its capital at Białystok.  However, after the Treaties of Tilsit, the Russian Empire agreed to the creation of the Duchy of Warsaw; but in exchange the department ceded four counties: Białostocki, Bielski, Sokólski, and Drohicki. Thus the department's capital had to be moved, and its name was accordingly changed to that of the new capital, Łomża.

After 1815 most of the Łomża Department's territory became part of Augustów Province. In 1867 it was reconstituted as the Łomża Governorate.

Administrative divisions
It was divided into 7 counties:
 Biebrzańsk County (seat in Szczuczyn)
 Dąbrowski County (seat in Lipsk, later in Augustów)
 Kalvarija County
 Łomża County
 Marijampolė County
 Tykociń County
 Wigierski-Sejny County (seat in Sejny)

References
  Dokumenty urzędowe dotyczące Łomży w okresie Księstwa Warszawskiego z 17 XII 1810 roku, 1 VI 1812 roku, 27 VII 1812 roku, Skarby Dziedzictwa Narodowego, Polska.pl

Departments of the Duchy of Warsaw
Łomża